Tales of Science and Sorcery is a collection of stories by American writer Clark Ashton Smith. It was released in 1964 and was the author's fifth collection of stories published by Arkham House.  It was released in an edition of 2,482 copies.  The stories were originally published between 1930 and 1958 in Weird Tales and other pulp magazines.

The collection contains stories from Smith's major story cycles of Hyperborea, Averoigne and Zothique.

Contents

Tales of Science and Sorcery contains the following stories:

 "Clark Ashton Smith: A Memoir", by E. Hoffmann Price
 "Master of the Asteroid"
 "The Seed from the Sepulchre"
 "The Root of Ampoi"
"The Immortals of Mercury"
 "Murder in the Fourth Dimension"
 "Seedling of Mars" (after a plot by E.M. Johnson)
 "The Maker of Gargoyles"
"The Great God Awto"
 "Mother of Toads"
"The Tomb-Spawn"
 "Schizoid Creator"
"Symposium of the Gorgon"
"The Theft of the Thirty-Nine Girdles"
"Morthylla"

Reprints
St. Albans, UK: Panther, 1976.

See also
 Clark Ashton Smith bibliography

Sources

1964 short story collections
Fantasy short story collections
Horror short story collections
Science fiction short story collections by Clark Ashton Smith
Arkham House books